Fludorex is a stimulant anorexic agent of the phenethylamine chemical class.

Synthesis

Grignard reaction between 3-Bromobenzotrifluoride [401-78-5] (1) and 1,2-dibromo-1-methoxyethane, CID:13226400 (2) leads to 1-(2-bromo-1-methoxyethyl)-3-(trifluoromethyl)benzene, CID:10589008 (3). The reaction with methylamine gives fludorex (4).

See also
The benzylamine is called SK&F 39728-A

References 

Stimulants
Trifluoromethyl compounds
Ethers
Phenylethanolamine ethers
Monoamine releasing agents